Planet (1855–1875) was a racehorse and U.S. Racing Hall of Fame inductee who, after Lexington, was considered the best horse before the American Civil War. He set a record for prize money earnings which stood for 20 years. (He earned $1,915,334.25 adjusted by inflation.)

Appearance 
Turf writer John Hervey described him as "a rich chestnut, 15.2½ (hands) tall, he was remarkable for his symmetry of mould and the excellence of his limbs" As well as that this majestic look was also implied by his nickname, The Great Red Fox.

Racing career 
In his career, Planet showed his durability and versatility by winning in multiple eastern states including Virginia, Georgia, South Carolina, Alabama,  Louisiana, and New York. He won 27 times in 31 starts defeating the best horses the late 1850s had to offer.

Stud career 
Most of his time as a stud was adversely affected because of the American Civil War. Sires had to be hidden in the woods in order for them to be safe. In 1868 he was sold to Robert A. Alexander of Woodburn Farm in Woodford County, Kentucky. He spent the rest of his life there before his death at age 20.

Planet was inducted into the National Museum of Racing and Hall of Fame in 2012.

References 

1855 racehorse births
1875 racehorse deaths
United States Thoroughbred Racing Hall of Fame inductees